Choe Yong-sim (born 13 October 1990 in Pyeongyang) is a North Korean women's international footballer who plays as a defender.

She is a member of the North Korea women's national football team. She was part of the team at the 2010 Asian Games, and 2012 Summer Olympics.  At club level, she played for Pyongyang City in North Korea.

References

External links
 
 
 
 Yong Sim Choe at SoccerPunter.com

1990 births
Living people
North Korean women's footballers
North Korea women's international footballers
People from Pyongyang
Women's association football defenders
Footballers at the 2010 Asian Games
Footballers at the 2012 Summer Olympics
Olympic footballers of North Korea
Asian Games silver medalists for North Korea
Asian Games medalists in football
Medalists at the 2010 Asian Games
21st-century North Korean women